Fotbal Club U Olimpia Cluj-Napoca, commonly known as FCU Olimpia Cluj, or simply as U Olimpia Cluj, is a women's football team from Cluj-Napoca in Romania. It is Romania's top women's football club, having won all league titles since its inception, and thus represents Romania year by year in the UEFA Women's Champions League. The club also gives a majority of the Romania women's national football team players.

History
Founded on 7 July 2010 at the initiative of Mirel Albon, Clujana's coach, due to increasingly divergent views with his club's owners, Olimpia started directly in Romania's top level women's league, as there was no second-level league at the time, and convincingly won the championship in its very first season. The team won all of its 24 matches which totaled a goal difference of 253–11 and wins as high as 26–0 and 27–0. The title qualified them for the 2011–12 UEFA Women's Champions League. In addition they won the Romanian cup that year too. They went on to win all of the league titles since, and most of the domestic cups.

Olimpia had a partnership with the Technical University of Cluj-Napoca, its rector, Radu Munteanu being for a period of time also Olimpia's chairman (president). This partnership reflected in the team's name between 2012 and 2015.
Since the 2018–19 season, the teams signed a partnership with FC Universitatea Cluj and has rebranded as "U" Olimpia Cluj.

Chronology of names

Football Academy
Together with the club in 2010 the Olimpia Women's Football Academy was established, supported by a partnership with the city and the council. The goal of south-east Europe's first female football academy is to advance women's football in Romania.

Honours

Leagues
Liga I
Winners (11): 2010–11, 2011–12, 2012–13, 2013–14, 2014–15, 2015–16, 2016–17, 2017–18, 2018–19, 2020–21, 2021–22
First place, not declared Winners (1): 2019–20

Cups
Romanian Women's Cup
Winners (8): 2010–11, 2011–12, 2012–13, 2013–14, 2014–15, 2016–17, 2020–21, 2021–22
Runners-up (1): 2015–16

Season by season

Current squad

Club officials

Board of directors

 Last updated: 13 January 2019
 Source:

Current technical staff

 Last updated: 13 January 2019
 Source:

FCU Olimpia Cluj in Europe

In their first participation they started in the qualifying round of the 2011–12 UEFA Women's Champions League. Already after two wins against Bosnian and Lithuanian opposition they qualified for the round of 32.

1 Group stage. Highest-ranked eliminated team in case of qualification, lowest-ranked qualified team in case of elimination.

Notable former players
The footballers enlisted below have been called up or had international cap(s) for their respective countries at junior and/or senior level and/or more than 50 caps for U Olimpia Cluj.

  Cosmina Dușa
  Maria Ficzay
  Adina Giurgiu
  Daniela Gurz
  Priscilla Hagan
  Lidia Havriștiuc
  Alexandra Iușan
  Alexandra Lunca
  Christine Manie
  Isabelle Mihail
  Corina Olar
  Olivia Oprea
  Andreea Părăluță
  Raluca Sârghe
  Ekaterina Ulasevich
  Fanny Vágó
  Ștefania Vătafu

References

External links
Club's website
Club at UEFA.com

 
Women's football clubs in Romania
Sport in Cluj County
Football clubs in Cluj County
Sport in Cluj-Napoca
Association football clubs established in 2010
2010 establishments in Romania
University and college association football clubs